Roxby is a surname. Notable people with the name include:

 Alice Maude-Roxby (born 1963), multidisciplinary artist
 David Howard Maude-Roxby-Montalto di Fragnito (born 1934), British artist
 Guy Roxby (1886–1913), Anglican missionary priest
 Robert Roxby (c.1809–1866), British actor
 Robert Roxby (cricketer) (1926–2010), Australian cricketer
 Robert Roxby (songwriter) (1767–1846), English songwriter
 Roddy Maude-Roxby (born 1930), English actor